Josef Seger was a Liechtenstein athlete. He competed in the men's decathlon at the 1948 Summer Olympics.

References

External links
 

Year of birth missing
Possibly living people
Athletes (track and field) at the 1948 Summer Olympics
Liechtenstein decathletes
Olympic athletes of Liechtenstein
Place of birth missing